Yarram Venkateswarareddy served as the Member of the Legislative Assembly for Sattenapalli constituency in Andhra Pradesh, India, between 2004 and 2009, and was re-elected in 2009. He joined Jana Sena Party.

References

Indian National Congress politicians from Andhra Pradesh
Jana Sena Party politicians
Year of birth missing (living people)
Andhra Pradesh MLAs 2004–2009
Andhra Pradesh MLAs 2009–2014
People from Guntur district
Living people